Grabie may refer to the following places:
Grabie, Kuyavian-Pomeranian Voivodeship (north-central Poland)
Grabie, Wieliczka County in Lesser Poland Voivodeship (south Poland)
Grabie, Łódź Voivodeship (central Poland)
Grabie, Bochnia County in Lesser Poland Voivodeship (south Poland)
Grabie, Kraków County in Lesser Poland Voivodeship (south Poland)
Grabie, Masovian Voivodeship (east-central Poland)
Grabie, Greater Poland Voivodeship (west-central Poland)
Grabie, Opole Voivodeship (south-west Poland)